Klawatti Glacier is located on the east slopes of Klawatti Peak, North Cascades National Park, in the U.S. state of Washington. Arêtes separate Klawatti Glacier from Inspiration Glacier to the southwest, McAllister Glacier to the northwest and North Klawatti Glacier to the north.

See also
List of glaciers in the United States

References

Glaciers of the North Cascades
Glaciers of Skagit County, Washington
Glaciers of Washington (state)